Caldiero 1805 order of battle

The armies of the First French Empire and the Austrian Empire fought the Battle of Caldiero from 29 to 31 October 1805 just east of Verona in Italy. Marshal André Masséna led the French Army of Italy while Archduke Charles commanded the Austrian Armee von Italien. Historians variously call the battle a French victory, an Austrian victory, or indecisive. Austrian losses were over 5,500, while the French suffered at least 5,000 casualties. Archduke Charles began a withdrawal from Italy on 1 November. The retreat ended in early December with Archduke Charles's army intact at Kormend in western Hungary. Unfortunately for Austria, by this time, Emperor Napoleon had decisively defeated the Austro-Russian army at the Battle of Austerlitz.

French order of battle

Army of Italy: Marshal André Masséna

Left Wing
Commander: Masséna
 Attached:
 2nd Italian Line Infantry Regiment (2 battalions)
 Reine Dragoon Regiment (4 squadrons)
 1st Division: General of Division Gaspard Amédée Gardanne
 1st Brigade: General of Brigade Louis Fursy Henri Compère
 22nd Light Infantry Regiment (3 battalions)
 52nd Line Infantry Regiment (3 battalions)
 2nd Brigade: General of Brigade Louis François Lanchatin
 29th Line Infantry Regiment (3 battalions)
 101st Line Infantry Regiment (3 battalions)
 Attached:
 23rd Chasseurs à Cheval Regiment (4 squadrons)
 15/2nd Foot Artillery Battery

 3rd Division: General of Division Gabriel Jean Joseph Molitor
 1st Brigade: General of Brigade Jean-Marie Auguste Aulnay de Launay
 23rd Line Infantry Regiment (4 battalions)
 79th Line Infantry Regiment (4 battalions)
 2nd Brigade: General of Brigade Jean-Baptiste Herbin-Dessaux
 5th Line Infantry Regiment (3 battalions)
 3rd Brigade: General of Brigade Guy Louis Henri de Valory
 60th Line Infantry Regiment (4 battalions)
 Attached:
 29th Dragoon Regiment (4 squadrons)
 8/2nd Foot Artillery Battery

 4th Division: General of Division Guillaume Philibert Duhesme
 1st Brigade: General of Brigade François Goullus
 1st Line Infantry Regiment (3 battalions)
 102nd Line Infantry Regiment (3 battalions)
 2nd Brigade: General of Brigade Jean Le Camus
 14th Light Infantry Regiment (3 battalions)
 20th Line Infantry Regiment (4 battalions)
 Attached:
 25th Chasseurs à Cheval Regiment (4 squadrons)
 19/2nd Foot Artillery Battery
 1st Brigade: General of Brigade Nicolas Bernard Guiot de Lacour
 24th Dragoon Regiment (4 squadrons)
 30th Dragoon Regiment (4 squadrons)
 Reserve Division: General of Division Louis Partouneaux
 1st Brigade: General of Brigade Jean-Baptiste Solignac
 1st Carabinier battalion
 2nd Grenadier battalion
 3rd Grenadier battalion
 4th Grenadier battalion
 2nd Brigade: General of Brigade François Valentin
 5th Grenadier battalion
 6th Grenadier battalion
 7th Grenadier battalion
 8th Grenadier battalion
 Attached:
 4/4th Horse Artillery Battery
 Reserve Cavalry Division: General of Division Julien Mermet
 1st Brigade: Detached to 4th Division.
 2nd Brigade: Colonel François-Joseph d'Offenstein
 7th Cuirassier Regiment (4 squadrons)
 8th Cuirassier Regiment (4 squadrons)
 Attached:
 3/1st Horse Artillery Battery
 Light Cavalry Division: General of Division Jean Louis d'Espagne
 1st Brigade: General of Brigade César Alexandre Debelle
 3rd Chasseurs à Cheval Regiment (4 squadrons)
 14th Chasseurs à Cheval Regiment (4 squadrons)
 2nd Brigade: Colonel Antoine Maurin
 15th Chasseurs à Cheval Regiment (4 squadrons)
 24th Chasseurs à Cheval Regiment (4 squadrons)
 Attached:
 4/1st Horse Artillery Battery

Right Wing

Commander: General of Division Jean-Antoine Verdier
 2nd Division: Verdier
 1st Brigade: General of Brigade Antoine Digonet
 23rd Light Infantry Regiment (3 battalions)
 10th Line Infantry Regiment (3 battalions)
 2nd Brigade: General of Brigade Jacques Brun
 56th Line Infantry Regiment (3 battalions)
 62nd Line Infantry Regiment (4 battalions)
 3rd Brigade: Colonel François Léon Ormancey
 4th Chasseurs à Cheval Regiment (4 squadrons)
 19th Chasseurs à Cheval Regiment (4 squadrons)
 3/4th Foot Artillery Battery
 Attached:
 Foot Dragoons (1 squadron)
 17/2nd Foot Artillery Battery
 Cavalry Division: General of Division Charles Randon de Pully
 1st Brigade: General of Brigade Maurice Fresia
 4th Cuirassier Regiment (4 squadrons)
 6th Cuirassier Regiment (4 squadrons)
 2nd Brigade: Colonel Archange Louis Rioult-Davenay
 23rd Dragoon Regiment (4 squadrons detached)
 29th Dragoon Regiment (detached to 3rd Division)

North of Verona
Commander: General of Division Jean Mathieu Seras (not engaged)
 5th Division: Seras
 1st Brigade: General of Brigade Jacques Laurent Gilly
 Légion Corse (1 battalion)
 8th Light Infantry Regiment (2 battalions)
 53rd Line Infantry Regiment (3 battalions)
 2nd Brigade: General of Brigade Pierre-Joseph Guillet
 81st Line Infantry Regiment (3 battalions)
 106th Line Infantry Regiment (3 battalions)
 3rd Brigade: General of Brigade Claude François de Malet
 13th Line Infantry Regiment (3 battalions)
 4th Brigade: General of Brigade Jean Jacques Schilt
 9th Line Infantry Regiment (2 battalions)
 Artillery: Italian Foot Artillery Battery

Austrian Army order of battle
A few months before the outbreak of war, Austrian infantry regiments were reorganized into four line battalions and one grenadier battalion. Each battalion consisted of four companies each of 160 musketeers.

Armee von Italien: Feldmarschall Archduke Charles

Right Wing
Commander: Feldmarschall-Leutnant Joseph Anton von Simbschen
 Division Simbschen
 Brigade: General-Major Johann Maria Philipp Frimont
 St. Georges Grenz Infantry Regiment Nr. 6 (3 battalions)
 Ferdinand Hussar Regiment Nr. 3 (4 squadrons)
 Brigade: Friedrich Kottunlinsky
 Schröder Infantry Regiment Nr. 7 (4 battalions)
 Lindenau Infantry Regiment Nr. 29 (4 battalions)
 Brigade: Stephan Mihaljevich
 Splenyi Infantry Regiment Nr. 51 (4 battalions)
 Brigade: Karl Soudain von Niederwerth
 Coburg Infantry Regiment Nr. 22 (4 battalions)
 Hohenlohe-Bartenstein Infantry Regiment Nr. 26 (4 battalions)

Center

Commander: General der Kavallerie Count Heinrich von Bellegarde
 Division (1st Line): Feldmarschall-Leutnant Ludwig von Vogelsang
 Brigade: General-Major Joseph Wetzel
 Archduke Ferdinand Infantry Regiment Nr. 2 (4 battalions)
 Franz Jellacic Infantry Regiment Nr. 62 (4 battalions)
 Brigade: General-Major Georg Croll von Herzberg
 Grenadier battalion Bellegarde Nr. 44
 Grenadier battalion Reisky Nr. 13
 Grenadier battalion Lattermann Nr. 45
 Grenadier battalion Schröder Nr. 7
 Grenadier battalion Archduke Rudolf Nr. 16
 Grenadier battalion Archduke Josef Nr. 63
 Grenadier battalion Wenzel Colloredo Nr. 56
 Cavalry Division: Feldmarschall-Leutnant Andreas O'Reilly von Ballinlough
 Kaiser Chevau-léger Regiment Nr. 1 (8 squadrons)
 Kienmayer Hussar Regiment Nr. 8 (8 squadrons)
 Division (2nd Line): Feldmarschall-Leutnant Karl Friedrich von Lindenau
 Brigade: General-Major Guido Lippa von Duba
 Grenadier battalion Coburg Nr. 22
 Grenadier battalion Hohenlohe Nr. 26
 Grenadier battalion Strassoldo Nr. 27
 Grenadier battalion Lindenau Nr. 29
 Brigade: General-Major Prince Ludwig of Hohenlohe-Bartenstein
 Grenadier battalion Archduke Ferdinand Nr. 2
 Grenadier battalion Sztarray Nr. 33
 Grenadier battalion Davidovich Nr. 34
 Grenadier battalion Auffenberg Nr. 37
 Grenadier battalion Franz Jellacic Nr. 62
 Brigade: unknown
 Esterhazy Infantry Regiment Nr. 34 (4 battalions)
 Cavalry Division: Feldmarschall-Leutnant Prince Joseph of Lorraine-Vaudémont
 Levenehr Dragoon Regiment Nr. 4 (8 squadrons)
 Savoy Dragoon Regiment Nr. 5 (8 squadrons)

Left Wing

Commander: Feldmarschall-Leutnant Prince Heinrich XV of Reuss-Plauen
 Division: Reuss
 Brigade: General-Major Johann Kalnássy
 Vukassovich Infantry Regiment Nr. 48 (4 battalions)
 Archduke Franz Carl Infantry Regiment Nr. 52 (4 battalions)
 Brigade: General-Major Hieronymus Karl Graf von Colloredo-Mansfeld
 Grenadier battalion Esterhazy Nr. 34
 Grenadier battalion Vukassovich Nr. 48
 Grenadier battalion Splenyi Nr. 51
 Grenadier battalion Saint-Julien Nr. 61
 Grenadier battalion Archduke Franz Carl Nr. 52
 Attached Cavalry:
 Archduke Charles Uhlan Regiment Nr. 3 (8 squadrons)

Far Left Wing
Commander: General-Major Armand von Nordmann
 Division: Nordmann
 Brigade: General-Major Franz Anthony von Siegenfeld
 Kreutzer Grenz Infantry Regiment Nr. 5 (3 battalions)
 Gradiscaner Grenz Infantry Regiment Nr. 8 (1 battalion)
 Brigade: Nordmann
 Gradiscaner Grenz Infantry Regiment Nr. 8 (2 battalions)
 Grenadier battalion Anspach Nr. 10
 Erdödy Hussar Regiment Nr. 9 (8 squadrons)

Reserve
Commander: Feldmarschall-Leutnant Eugène-Guillaume Argenteau
 Brigade: General-Major Alois von Gavasini
 Archduke Rudolf Infantry Regiment Nr. 16 (4 battalions)
 Lattermann Infantry Regiment Nr. 45 (3 battalions)
 Stipczic Hussar Regiment Nr. 10 (8 squadrons)

Detached Corps

Commander: Feldmarschall-Leutnant Paul Davidovich (not engaged)
 Division: Feldmarschall-Leutnant Prince Franz Seraph of Rosenberg-Orsini
 Brigade: General-Major Joseph Radetzky von Radetz
 Szluiner Grenz Infantry Regiment Nr. 4 (3 battalions)
 Ott Hussars Nr. 5 (8 squadrons)
 Brigade: General-Major Peter Knesevich
 Reiski Infantry Regiment Nr. 13 (4 battalions)
 Archduke Joseph Infantry Regiment Nr. 63 (4 battalions)
 Archduke Joseph Hussar Regiment Nr. 2 (6 squadrons)
 Division: General-Major Wunibald Löwenberg
 Brigade: Löwenberg
 1st Banat Grenz Infantry Regiment Nr. 10 (3 battalions)
 Archduke Joseph Hussar Regiment Nr. 2 (2 squadrons)

Detached Division
Commander: Feldmarschall-Leutnant Josef Philipp Vukassovich (replaced by Rosenberg) (not engaged)
 Division: Rosenberg vice Vukassovich
 Brigade: General-Major Hannibal Sommariva
 Licaner Grenz Infantry Regiment Nr. 1 (3 battalions)
 Ottocaner Grenz Infantry Regiment Nr. 2 (1 battalion)
 2nd Banat Grenz Infantry Regiment Nr. 11 (3 battalions)
 Archduke Ferdinand Hussar Regiment Nr. 3 (4 squadrons)
 Brigade: General-Major Karl Hillinger
 Davidovich Infantry Regiment Nr. 34 (4 battalions)
 Auffenberg Infantry Regiment Nr. 37 (3 battalions)

Footnotes

References

Books
 Pigeard, Alain. Dictionnaire des batailles de Napoléon. Tallandier, Bibliothèque Napoléonienne, 2004. 

 Schneid, Frederick C. Napoleon's Italian Campaigns: 1805–1815. Westport, Conn.: Praeger Publishers, 2002.

External links
 The following webpages are excellent sources for the full names of general officers.
 napoleon-series.org Dictionary of Austrian Generals 1792–1815 by Digby Smith, compiled by Leopold Kudrna
 French Wikipedia, Liste des généraux de la Révolution et du Premier Empire

Napoleonic Wars orders of battle
Battles of the War of the Third Coalition